Fabiola Zuluaga was the defending champion and successfully defended her title, by defeating María Sánchez Lorenzo 3–6, 6–4, 6–2 in the final.

Seeds
The first two seeds received a bye into the second round.

Draw

Finals

Top half

Bottom half

References
 Official results archive (ITF)
 Official results archive (WTA)

Copa Colsanitas Seguros Bolivar - Singles
2004 Singles